The 2022–23 season is the Chittagong Abahani's 43rd season since its establishment in 1980 and their 13th season in the Bangladesh Premier League. This also remarks their 9th consecutive season in the top flight after getting promoted in 2014. In addition to domestic league, Ctg Abahani will participate on this season's edition of Federation Cup and Independence Cup. The season will cover the period from October 2022 to June 2023.

This season marks the return of head coach Saiful Bari Titu for his second spell replacing Maruful Haque, who departed to Sheikh Jamal DC after letting his contract expire. This season is the first since 2014–2015 season without Koushik Barua, one of the longest serving player of the club's history, as he departed to join Sheikh Jamal DC.

Players
Players statistics and squad numbers last updated on 25 February 2023. Appearances include all competitions and official matches.Note: Flags indicate national team as has been defined under FIFA eligibility rules. Players may hold more than one non-FIFA nationality.

Transfers

Transfers in

Transfers out

Competitions

Overall record

Independence Cup

Group stage

The draw for the group stage was held on 31 October 2022.

Knockout phase

Quarter-final

Federation Cup

Group stage

The draw for the group stage was held on 25 November 2022.

Knockout phase

Quarter-final

Premier League

League table

Results summary

Results by round

Matches

Statistics

Squad statistics
Includes all competitions.

|-
! colspan=16 style="background:#007AFC; color:#FBFD00;" text-align:center| Players who left during the season but made an appearance

|-

Goalscorers

Assists

References

2022 in Bangladeshi football
Bangladeshi football club records and statistics
Sport in Chittagong
2023 in Bangladeshi football